Semirechye is a rural locality (a khutor) in Kugarchinsky Selsoviet, Kugarchinsky District, Bashkortostan, Russia. The population was 90 as of 2010. There is 1 street.

Geography 
Semirechye is located 46 km south of Mrakovo (the district's administrative centre) by road. Davletkulovo 1-ye is the nearest rural locality.

References 

Rural localities in Kugarchinsky District